Joe or Joseph Costello may refer to:
 Joe Costello (politician) (born 1945), Irish Labour Party politician
 Joseph Costello (software executive) (born 1953), American computer software executive
 Joseph Arthur Costello (1915–1978), American bishop of the Catholic Church
 Joseph J. Costello (1892–1960), mayor of Galway
 Joe Costello (American football) (born 1960), American football defensive end